Ophryophryne is a genus of amphibian in the family Megophryidae from Southeast Asia. They are sometimes known as mountain toads.

Species
The genus contains the following six species:
 Ophrophryne elfina 
 Ophryophryne gerti Ohler, 2003
 Ophryophryne hansi Ohler, 2003
 Ophryophryne microstoma Boulenger, 1903
 Ophryophryne pachyproctus Kou, 1985
 Ophryophryne synoria Stuart, Sok, and Neang, 2006

References

 
Amphibians of Asia
Amphibian genera
Taxa named by George Albert Boulenger
Taxonomy articles created by Polbot